The 2012–13 season was the Cornish Pirates tenth season in the second tier of the English rugby union league system, the RFU Championship and their fourth in the British and Irish Cup.

Pre–season friendlies

RFU Championship
Stage one consists of twelve teams playing each of the other teams twice, once at home and once away, making a total of 22 games for each team. The league programme starts on Saturday, 1 September 2012 and will be completed by Saturday, 20 April 2013.  The top four teams qualify for the two–legged semi–finals whilst the bottom team will be relegated to National League 1.

Stage one fixtures

Stage one league table

British and Irish Cup
The 2012–13 British and Irish Cup is the fourth season of the annual rugby union competition for second tier, semi-professional and professional clubs from Britain and Ireland. First round matches began on the weekend of 13 October 2012 and the final will be on the weekend of 17 May 2013. The competition consists of eight groups of four teams playing each other twice to give each team six matches. The top team in each group qualifies for the quarter–finals and the final will be played at a venue to be decided when the finalists are known. The Pirates are in Pool 3.

Group stage

Quarter–final
The quarter–finals were played on the weekend of 6 April and was decided by how well each group winner performed in the group matches. This is the third time in four seasons that the two teams have met with the Pirates winning the two previous encounters. Details of the full draw can be found at 2012–13 British and Irish Cup.

Squad 2012–13

Dual registration
 David Ewers (Exeter Chiefs)
 Lloyd Fairbrother (Exeter Chiefs)
 Sam Hill (Exeter Chiefs)
 Charles Walker–Blair (Exeter Chiefs)
 Rob Cook (Gloucester)
 Jack Yeandle (Exeter Chiefs)
 Lewis Vinnicombe (Redruth)
 Owen Hambly (Redruth)
 Tom Duncan (Redruth)
 Ashley Smith (London Welsh)
 Jack Nowell

Transfers 2012–13

Players in
  Tom Bedford (from  Newcastle Falcons)
  Darren Berry (rugby player) (from  Bristol)
  Alex Cheeseman (from  London Wasps)
  Adam Clayton (from  Birmingham & Solihull Bees)
 Alaifatu Junior Fatialofa (from  Bristol)
 Kieran Hallett (from  Nottingham)
 Gary Johnson (from  London Welsh)
 David Lyons (from  Moseley) 
 Kyle Moyle (from  St Ives) 
 Ben Prescott (from  Northampton Saints and  Nottingham) 
 Tom Riley from ( Newport Gwent Dragons) 
  Darren Semmems (from  Cornish All Blacks)
 Peter Joyce (from  Redruth) 
  Ben Mercer (unregistered)

Players out
 Rudi Brits (released)
 Rob Cook (to  Gloucester) (dual registration from 7 September)
 Tom Cooper (to  Jersey)
 Tom Cowan–Dickie (to  Plymouth Albion and  Exeter Chiefs, dual registration) 
 Darren Daniel (released from contract in March 2012)
 David Doherty (to  Leeds Carnegie)
 James Doherty (to  Leeds Carnegie)
 Drew Locke (to  Gloucester)
 Rhodri McAtee (released and moving to  Plymouth Albion) 
 Mike Myerscough (to  Leeds Carnegie)
 Ian Nimmo (to  Newport Gwent Dragons)
 Carl Rimmer (to  Exeter Chiefs) 
 Matt Smith (to  Leeds Carnegie)
 Andrew Suniula (released)
 Ceiron Thomas (released and moving to  St Ives RFC) 
 Dave Ward (to  Harlequins)
 Ryan Westren

Coaching staff
 Ian Davies (Head Coach) from April 2012. Previously Forwards Coach appointed in April 2009.
 Harvey Biljon (Backs Coach) appointed in April 2009.
 Simon Raynes (Strength and Conditioning Coach) since summer 2005.

See also

2012–13 RFU Championship
2012–13 British and Irish Cup

References

External links
Cornish Pirates
Cornish Pirates unofficial fans site
Cornish Rugby

Cornish Pirates seasons
Cornish Pirates
Cornish Pirates